Andrei Gheorghe (born 14 September 1987) is a Romanian-born Guatemalan modern pentathlete. He competed at the 2012 Summer Olympics.

References

External links
 

1987 births
Living people
Guatemalan male modern pentathletes
Olympic modern pentathletes of Guatemala
Modern pentathletes at the 2011 Pan American Games
Modern pentathletes at the 2012 Summer Olympics
Sportspeople from Bucharest
Pan American Games silver medalists for Guatemala
Pan American Games medalists in modern pentathlon
Medalists at the 2011 Pan American Games